Veidekke Group's Swedish services are represented by the company Veidekke Sverige AB. Operations are mainly driven by construction and property development.

Subsidiaries of Veidekke Sverige AB
Veidekke Anläggning Öst AB started its operations in Sweden in 2000 and have about 150 employees. Operations are mainly construction of roads, tunnels, bridges, docks and industry. In 2005 turnover was SEK 500 million.
Veidekke Bostad AB was established in Sweden in 2000. The company has about 45 employees and is led by Håkan Bergqvist. Veidekke Bostad is a project-development company. Its operations include buying land and development of properties. The company is represented in the Stockholm region/ Mälardalen and Skåne.
Veidekke Bygg Stockholm AB is a building/construction company that evolved from Veidekke Stockholm AB, founded in 2000. The company's operations include building properties in close relation to Veidekke Bostad AB and other customers, in particular in the Stockholm/Mälardalen region.
Veidekke Construction AB VECON, is a construction company based in Göteborg in 1998. In western parts of Sweden, VECON operates in construction areas like ground and foundation works, water and drain, and housing.
Veidekke Skåne AB was founded 2003 with offices in both Helsingborg and Lund in Sweden. The company operations include construction project development, new production, rehabilitation and ground works in the Skåne region.

External links 
Veidekke in Sweden, swedish website

Construction and civil engineering companies of Sweden
Veidekke Group
Property management companies
Swedish companies established in 2000
Construction and civil engineering companies established in 2000
Companies based in Solna Municipality